Performance is the eleventh studio album by German rock band Eloy, which was released in 1983.

Track listing
All songs composed and arranged by Eloy. Lyrics by Sigi Hausen.

Tracks 8, 9 and 10 are bonus tracks from the 2005 remastered edition.

Personnel
 Frank Bornemann — guitar, vocals
 Hannes Arkona — guitar, keyboards
 Hannes Folberth — keyboards, piano
 Klaus-Peter Matziol — bass
 Fritz Randow — drums, percussion

References

External links

1983 albums
Eloy (band) albums